Kasper Asgreen (born 8 February 1995) is a Danish cyclist, who currently rides for UCI WorldTeam . Asgreen won the 2021 edition of the Tour of Flanders by defeating Mathieu van der Poel in a sprint finish.

Early life
Asgreen was born in Kolding in the south of Denmark. He competed in dressage up to the age of 14, before joining Kolding Cycling Club.

Career
Asgreen signed for Danish Continental cycling team  in 2016. In the same year, he finished second in the U23 event at the Danish National Time Trial Championships, as well as finishing second in the senior event. In 2017, he won the U23 time trial at the Danish National Championships, alongside the U23 event at the European Road Championships.

Asgreen signed for World Tour team  in April 2018 and began riding with the team in the same month. Following strong performances in his first few races, including at the Scheldeprijs where he helped team-mate Fabio Jakobsen to victory, he was named on the start list of the 2018 Vuelta a España. He was also part of the Quick-Step team which won the Team Time Trial event at the 2018 UCI Road World Championships.

In 2019, Asgreen finished second in the Tour of Flanders on his race debut, the only rider to escape a chasing group behind race leader Alberto Bettiol. He also won the second stage of the 2019 Tour of California after accelerating on the final turn from a group containing Tejay Van Garderen and Gianni Moscon, plus a stage at the Deutschland Tour. Later in the year, he won his first title in the Men's Senior event at the Danish National Time Trial Championships.

In March 2020, Asgreen won the Kuurne–Brussels–Kuurne race by a margin of three seconds from the peloton, after bridging across to an existing breakaway earlier in the race. He also retained his title at the Danish National Time Trial Championships, as well as the Road Race, accelerating away from Andreas Kron to take victory by nine seconds.

Asgreen began his 2021 season with a victory at the E3 Saxo Bank Classic, attacking with five kilometres to go after having participated in a previous breakaway. A week later, he claimed his first monument win at the 2021 Tour of Flanders, beating race favourite Mathieu van der Poel in a sprint after the pair rode clear together. He also won the Danish National Time Trial for the third consecutive year.

Major results

2016
 1st  Time trial, National Under-23 Road Championships
 3rd Time trial, National Road Championships
 3rd GP Viborg
 3rd Overall Tour de Berlin
 5th Time trial, UCI Road World Under-23 Championships
2017
 1st  Time trial, UEC European Under-23 Road Championships
 1st  Time trial, National Under-23 Road Championships
 1st GP Viborg
 1st Stage 1 Tour de l'Avenir
 6th Duo Normand (with Niklas Larsen)
 7th Time trial, UCI Road World Under-23 Championships
2018
 1st  Team time trial, UCI Road World Championships
 1st Stage 1 (TTT) Adriatica Ionica Race
 2nd Overall Istrian Spring Trophy
1st Stage 1
 4th Time trial, National Road Championships
 6th Trofeo Laigueglia
2019
 National Road Championships
1st  Time trial
2nd Road race
 1st Stage 3 Deutschland Tour
 2nd  Time trial, UEC European Road Championships
 2nd Tour of Flanders
 3rd Overall Tour of California
1st  Points classification
1st Stage 2
2020
 National Road Championships
1st  Road race
1st  Time trial
 1st Kuurne–Brussels–Kuurne
 6th Time trial, UCI Road World Championships
 9th Three Days of Bruges–De Panne
2021
 1st  Time trial, National Road Championships
 1st Tour of Flanders
 1st E3 Saxo Bank Classic
 3rd Overall Volta ao Algarve
1st Stage 4 (ITT)
 4th Time trial, UCI Road World Championships
 4th Druivenkoers Overijse
 7th Time trial, Olympic Games
 7th Time trial, UEC European Road Championships
2022
 3rd Strade Bianche
 6th Amstel Gold Race
 10th E3 Saxo Bank Classic
2023
 1st  Mountains classification, Volta ao Algarve

Grand Tour general classification results timeline

Classics results timeline

References

External links

1995 births
Living people
People from Kolding
Danish male cyclists
Olympic cyclists of Denmark
Cyclists at the 2020 Summer Olympics
Sportspeople from the Region of Southern Denmark